Birds described in 1903 include  black-and-cinnamon fantail, Fernando Po batis, grey-eyed bulbul, grey-headed broadbill, Indian yellow-nosed albatross, Mindanao white-eye, mountain peacock-pheasant, pale batis, Sharpe's akalat, Shelley's oliveback, Somali lark, Ursula's sunbird, western fieldwren

Events 
Death of  Thomas McIlwraith, Alexander von Homeyer, Neville Henry Cayley 
Robert Hall explores Siberia, Korea and Japan

Publications
Ernst Hartert Die Vögel der paläarktischen Fauna. Systematische Uebersicht der in Europa, Nord-Asien und der Mittelmeerregionen vorkommenden Vogel. Von Ernst Hartert. Heft I. Berlin: Friedlander. 8vo. Pp. 112, November 1903.
Reginald Badham Lodge Pictures of Bird-life in Woodland, Meadow, Mountain, and Marsh. By R. B. Lodge. 4to. London : Boustield & Co., 1903.
Oscar Neumann 1903: Neue afrikanische Species und Subspecies. In: Ornithologische Monatsberichte. Bd. 11, Nr. 12, S. 180–187.
Arthur Humble Evans, 1903. Turner on birds: a short and succinct history of the principal birds noticed by Pliny and Aristotle, first published by Doctor William Turner, 1544. Cambridge U.P.
Eugene W. Oates On the Silver‐Pheasants of Burma Ibis 1903:93-106
Tommaso Salvadori, 1903 Contribuzioni alla ornitologia delle Isole del Golfo di Guinea. Memorie della Reale Academia delle Scienze di Torino, serie II, tomo LIII (1903) I – Uccelli dell'Isola del Principe, II – Uccelli dell'Isola di San Thomé III – Uccelli di Anno-Bom e di Fernando Po
Ongoing events
Osbert Salvin and Frederick DuCane Godman 1879–1904. Biologia Centrali-Americana . Aves
Members of the German Ornithologists' Society in Journal für Ornithologie online BHL
The Ibis
Novitates Zoologicae
Ornithologische Monatsberichte Verlag von R. Friedländer & Sohn, Berlin. Years of publication: 1893–1938 online Zobodat
Ornis; internationale Zeitschrift für die gesammte Ornithologie.Vienna 1885-1905 online BHL
Anton Reichenow Die Vögel Afrikas Neudamm, J. Neumann,1900-05 online BHL
Robert Ridgway, 1902-1919 [1941, 1946]  The birds of North and Middle America : a descriptive catalogue of the higher groups, genera, species, and subspecies of birds known to occur in North America, from the Arctic lands to the Isthmus of Panama, the West Indies and other islands of the Caribbean sea, and the Galapagos Archipelago Washington Govt. Print. Off. online BHL
The Auk online BHL

References

Bird
Birding and ornithology by year